Yondiradi Kuydiradi is a 2011 Uzbek comedy film directed by Bahrom Yakubov and produced by Ruslan Mirzayev. The film stars Ulugbek Kadyrov, Saida Rametova and Lola Yoʻldosheva - the brightest examples of Uzbek cinema. Luiza Rasulova played a supporting role in this film. It was after this film and films "O Maryam, Maryam" that the actress became known to the world of cinema.

Plot
An Uzbek comedy, the plot of which revolves around our two main characters. Beautiful Lola, who graduated from a foreign university and returned to her homeland, and about Azamat, a typical Uzbek guy, whose life spends more time on the streets of Tashkent.

Cast 
 Ulugbek Kadirov: Azamat
 Lola Yoʻldosheva: Lola
 Saida Rametova: Saodat
 Luiza Rasulova: ?
 Sardor Zoirov : Asatbek
 Elyor Nosirov: Jamshid
 Umid Zokirov : Bekzod
 Feruza Yusupova :

References